Giulia Casoni and Janette Husárová were the reigning champions, but did not compete this year.

Justine Henin and Meghann Shaughnessy won the title by defeating Åsa Carlsson and Miriam Oremans 6–1, 7–6(8–6) in the final. It was the 1st title for Henin and the 3rd title for Shaughnessy in their respective doubles careers.

Seeds

Draw

Draw

External links
 Tournament profile (ITF)
 Tournament profile (WTA)

Thalgo Australian Women's Hardcourts – Doubles
2002 Thalgo Australian Women's Hardcourts